Club Sportivo Dock Sud is an Argentine football club based in the Dock Sud district of Avellaneda Partido, Greater Buenos Aires. The club is mostly known for its football team, which currently plays in Primera C Metropolitana, the regionalised fourth division of the Argentine football league system.

History

A club called Club Atlético Dock Sud was founded in 1914, but it was soon dissolved. In 1916 the same individuals formed a new club named Sportivo Dock Sud, which has continued since then.

Dock Sud played at the top division of Argentine football,  Primera División, from 1922 and 1926, being its best campaign in 1924 when the team finished 3rd. The squad returned to the first division in 1933 and 1934, when it participated in the AAF Amateur league.

Dock Sud's finest achievement to date was winning the 1933 amateur AAF league title. The team has had little success since turning professional other than a few lower league titles. In May, 2011, Dock Sud obtained a new title, promoting to Primera C after winning the 2010-11 championship.

Honours 
Primera División (1): 1933
Primera B (2): 1921, 1932
Primera D (2): 1984, 2010–11

Notes

References

External links 

 

Association football clubs established in 1916
Football clubs in Avellaneda
1916 establishments in Argentina